Drankovec is a small settlement in the Municipality of Pesnica in northeastern Slovenia. It lies in the western part of the Slovene Hills. The area is part of the traditional region of Styria. It is now included in the Drava Statistical Region.

References

External links
Drankovec on Geopedia

Populated places in the Municipality of Pesnica